Thermostatic valve may refer to:

 Thermostatic radiator valve
 Thermostatic mixing valve
 Thermal expansion valve